San Diego Bay National Wildlife Refuge is an urban refuge located on San Diego Bay in San Diego County, California. It is part of the San Diego National Wildlife Refuge Complex. It was dedicated in June 1999.

The refuge, comprising  of salt marsh and coastal uplands surrounded by urban development, is a critically important area for wildlife because over 90 percent of the historic wetlands of San Diego Bay have been filled in, drained, or diked.

Sweetwater Marsh provides habitat for four endangered or threatened species, including light-footed rail. It is also the only place in the United States where yerba reuma, a member of the heath family, grows naturally. More than 200 species of birds have been recorded on the refuge.

With 90 to 100% of submerged lands, intertidal mudflats, and salt marshes eliminated in the north and central Bay, the South Bay unit of the refuge will preserve and restore the remaining wetlands, mudflats and eelgrass beds to ensure that the bay's thousands of migrating and resident shorebirds and waterfowl will survive into the next century.

References
Refuge profile
Refuge website

National Wildlife Refuges in California
San Diego Bay
Protected areas of San Diego County, California
South Bay (San Diego County)
Wetlands of California
Natural history of San Diego County, California
Protected areas established in 1999
1999 establishments in California